The Hunter 36 Legend is an American sailboat, that was designed by Glenn Henderson  and first built in 2001.

The design can be confused with the 1980 Hunter 36, 2008 Hunter 36-2 (sold as the Hunter 36) and the 1990 Hunter 36 Vision, all sailboats with similar names by the same builder.

Production
The design was built by Hunter Marine in the United States, but it is now out of production.

Design

The Hunter 36 Legend is a recreational keelboat, built predominantly of fiberglass.

The design has a fractional sloop B&R rig, a nearly-plumb stem, a walk-through reverse transom, an internally-mounted spade-type rudder controlled by a wheel and a fixed fin keel or wing keel. It displaces  and carries  of ballast.

The boat is fitted with an inboard engine.

See also
List of sailing boat types

Similar sailboats
Beneteau 361
C&C 36-1
C&C 36R
C&C 110
Catalina 36
Columbia 36
Coronado 35
CS 36
Ericson 36
Frigate 36
Hunter 36
Hunter 36-2
Hunter 36 Vision
Islander 36
Nonsuch 36
Portman 36
S2 11.0
Seidelmann 37
Watkins 36
Watkins 36C

References

External links

Keelboats
2000s sailboat type designs
Sailing yachts
Sailboat type designs by Glenn Henderson
Sailboat types built by Hunter Marine